Weekends with Adele is the first concert residency by British singer Adele, held at The Colosseum at Caesars Palace from 18 November 2022 and planned to continue until 25 March 2023, and comprising a five-month series of Friday and Saturday night shows.

Background 
The residency was originally planned to take place between 21 January and 16 April 2022 but it was delayed on 20 January when Adele announced the postponement of the entire residency, saying "I'm so sorry, but my show ain't ready. Half my team have COVID and it's been impossible to finish the show." She also cited "delivery delays" as a reason, and apologized to the fans, many of whom supported her stance, while others criticized her "last minute" decision costing "flight and hotel bookings". The 24 rescheduled dates, along with eight additional dates, were announced on 25 July. She added two New Year's Eve weekend shows to her residency on Friday December 30, and Saturday December 31, 2022.

Critical reception 
The show has been unanimously lauded by critics. Katie Atkinson of Billboard called the performance "utterly and breathlessly spectacular", adding: "It was remarkable to see a performer at her level be so present and take in all she had accomplished in arriving at this moment." According to Lindsay Zoladz of The New York Times, "Adele's stage is breathtaking, full of drama and elegance befitting her voice." In his 4/4 star review of the show, Keiran Southern of The Times said the show was "spectacular, intimate and worth the wait". Also giving it a perfect score, The Telegraph Neil McCormick called the show "intimate but spectacular, eccentric yet slick and richly emotional."

Set list
This is the set list as posted on Billboard as of 19 November 2022. It may not represent every show.

 "Hello"
 "Easy on Me"
 "Turning Tables"
 "Take It All"
 "I Drink Wine"
 "Water Under the Bridge"
 "Send My Love (To Your New Lover)"
 "Oh My God"
 "One and Only"
 "Don't You Remember"
 "Rumour Has It"
 "Skyfall"
 "Hometown Glory"
 "Love in the Dark"
 "Set Fire to the Rain" 
 "When We Were Young"
 "Hold On"
 "Someone Like You"
 "Rolling in the Deep"
 "Love Is a Game"

Notes

 On November 25, December 31 & March 10th, Adele additionally performed "Make You Feel My Love".

Shows

References 

2022 concert residencies
2023 concert residencies
Concert residencies in the Las Vegas Valley
Adele